Kran Peninsula is the heavily indented peninsula forming the northeast extremity of Liège Island in the Palmer Archipelago, Antarctica.  It extends 2.85 km in north-south direction and 2.35 km in east-west direction, ending up in Moureaux Point to the north and Neyt Point to the east, and connected to the rest of the island by a 200 m wide neck to the south.

The feature is named after the town of Kran in Southern Bulgaria.

Location
British mapping in 1978.

Maps
 British Antarctic Territory.  Scale 1:200000 topographic map.  DOS 610 Series, Sheet W 63 60.  Directorate of Overseas Surveys, UK, 1978.
 Antarctic Digital Database (ADD). Scale 1:250000 topographic map of Antarctica. Scientific Committee on Antarctic Research (SCAR), 1993–2016.

See also
Mount Pierre (Palmer Archipelago)

References
 Bulgarian Antarctic Gazetteer. Antarctic Place-names Commission. (details in Bulgarian, basic data in English)
 Kran Peninsula. SCAR Composite Antarctic Gazetteer.

External links
 Kran Peninsula. Copernix satellite image
 Kran Peninsula on AADC website

Bulgaria and the Antarctic
Peninsulas of Graham Land
Landforms of the Palmer Archipelago
Liège Island